Ghadimi is a surname. Notable people with the surname include:

Masoud Ghadimi (1965–2003), Iranian wrestler
Vincent Ghadimi (born 1968), Belgian pianist and composer, piano and solfège professor and accompanist